Anar is the debut solo album by Czech songwriter, musician, actress, and singer Markéta Irglová. It was released in United States on October 11, 2011 on the ANTI- record label. The title of the album is from the Persian word انار (anâr), meaning "pomegranate". The album also contains a traditional Persian song, "Dokhtar Ghoochani".

Track listing

References

2011 albums
Markéta Irglová albums
Anti- (record label) albums